Boots is the debut studio album by Nancy Sinatra, released by Reprise Records on March 15, 1966. Arranged and conducted by Billy Strange, the album was produced by Lee Hazlewood. It peaked at number 5 on the Billboard 200 chart. It includes "These Boots Are Made for Walkin'", which topped the Billboard Hot 100 chart and the UK Singles Chart.

Although not credited, Sinatra was backed by members of the Wrecking Crew on the recordings. It was certified Gold by the RIAA for sales for 500,000 copies in November of that year.

Track listing

Charts

References

External links
 
 

1966 debut albums
Nancy Sinatra albums
Albums arranged by Billy Strange
Albums conducted by Billy Strange
Albums produced by Lee Hazlewood
Reprise Records albums
Sundazed Records albums